Mariama Goodman (born 25 December 1977) is an English dancer and singer who is currently a member of girl group Honeyz. She is also known for being a former member of the girl group Solid Harmonie.

Biography

Solid HarmoniE
Goodman began her pop career in 1996 signed to Jive Records in the United States with Solid HarmoniE. The group had the same management as, and toured regularly with, 'N Sync and the Backstreet Boys. The group disbanded in 2000 but reunited (without Goodman) in 2013.

Honeyz
When Solid HarmoniE split, Goodman returned to the UK and was invited to join the Honeyz alongside Célena Cherry and Naima Belkhiati. Former member Heavenli Abdi had left the Honeyz after two singles. The album Wonder No. 8 went gold and spawned five top ten singles: "Won't Take It Lying Down", "Never Let You Down", "Love of a Lifetime", "End of the Line" and "Finally Found". At the Maxim Awards in 2000, they won the prize for Best British Girl Band and were also nominated in that year's BRIT and MOBO Awards. Heavenli Abdi returned to the Honeyz when Goodman left and they released two more singles which charted at number 24 and 28. The band then split.

Despite Celena Cherry insisting in 2009 that there was "zero" chance of Honeyz getting back together, it was confirmed in October 2012 that Honeyz would be reuniting for The Big Reunion documentary on ITV2 in January 2013. Although Belkhiati was in the original lineup, she decided not to take part in the reformation, so Goodman took her place. The series began airing on 31 January 2013 and followed the group rehearsing for two weeks ahead of one major comeback performance at the London Hammersmith Apollo on 26 February 2013. The bands also went on an arena tour.

Non-musical career
Goodman moved to the United States for two years, and when she returned to the UK she began her training in midwifery. She graduated with a First Class Honours degree and is working as a midwife.

Personal life
She has a daughter, born in 2011.

Mariama married actor Andrew-Lee Potts on 20 August 2014. The couple had a son in 2016.

References

Living people
English women singers
British contemporary R&B singers
Honeyz members
Solid HarmoniE members
1977 births
English midwives